The Sarre is a river in Saxony-Anhalt, Germany.  It is a left tributary of the Bode, which it joins near Groß Germersleben.

See also 
List of rivers of Saxony-Anhalt

References 

Rivers of Saxony-Anhalt
Rivers of Germany